Stuffed squid (Greek: Γεμιστό καλαμάρι/Καλαμάρι γεμιστό) is a generic name for meals made of olive oil, Spanish onion, garlic,  rice, tomatoes, salt, black pepper, mint leaves, parsley, squid and tomato juice. It is mostly popular in Turkey and Greece.

Tunisian stuffed squids recipes (Tunisian: كلامار محشي kalamar mihshi) are frequent, and diverse along the Coastal East of the country. They are eaten as a main course, either alone in a spicy harissa and tomato sauce or as part of a couscous dish.

In the Central Sahel region (Sousse, Monastir and Mahdia), the stuffing main ingredients are greens such as chards or spinach, often mixed with generous quantities of fresh parsley and chopped onions. To the greens are added a small quantity of either rice, bulgur, barley semolina or precooked chickpeas and a protein element which can be either hard-boiled eggs and the squids' tentacles finely chopped, or a mix the tentacles, sheep liver and other sheep offal, and raw eggs to gather together the stuffing. The stuffing is flavored with harrissa or spicy dry paprika and other spices such as garlic, dry mint or powdered fenel or a coriander and caraway mixture. 

In the Southern part of the Tunisian coast, in the Gabes region, the stuffing tends to use less or no greens, but uses as main ingredients the chopped tentacles and pre-cooked chickpeas, to which are added carrots, onions, garlic, coriander and carraway seeds and instead of harissa, the regionally ubiquitous hrous (pickled onion and red peper paste).

References

Turkish cuisine dolmas and sarmas
Greek cuisine

Tunisian cuisine
Squid as food